Sylhet bus terminal is a modern bus terminal located in Kadamtali, Sylhet, which is ready for inauguration. It is built with a blend of tradition and modernity. The bus terminal will be the most modern and attractive bus terminal in Bangladesh.

Construction
The design of the bus terminal blends modern trends with local traditions – historic Assam-style houses and Ali Amjad's tower clock. Sylhet City Corporation (SCC) under Municipal Governance Service Project (MGSP) has constructed it on a six-acre land at a cost of around 63 crore taka with World Bank funding. Construction began in 2019, but construction was delayed by the pandemic. Architects Subrata Das, Robin Dey and Mohammad Jashim Uddin co-developed the infrastructure.

Infrastructure
The entry and exit gates of the terminal have been constructed in accordance with those at airports. The terminal features a waiting lounge with a capacity for 1500 people.
The entire terminal has been divided into three sections. The length of the departure building located in Part-1 is 350 feet, and arrival building located in Part-2 is around 300 feet long. The departure building has 48 bus bays including a large hall with 970 seats for passengers. It also has a 30-seat VIP room, 30 ticket counters, and a prayer room. Six washrooms have been built for men, women and handicapped people.

A multipurpose welfare center built in Part-3 at the rear of the terminal for meetings and programs for the drivers, support staffs and vehicle owners.

References

See Also
 Osmani International Airport
 Bangladesh Road Transport Corporation

Bus stations in Bangladesh
Transport in Sylhet
Buildings and structures in Sylhet